Gheorghe Bantîş (born 19 June 1989) is a Moldovan footballer who currently plays for FC Milsami Orhei.

External links

Profile at FC Milsami Orhei

1989 births
Footballers from Chișinău
Moldovan footballers
Living people
Association football goalkeepers
FC Milsami Orhei players